David and Bathsheba may refer to:
 David and Bathsheba, husband and wife in Hebrew Bible, parents of Solomon 
David and Bethsabe, a 1588 play by George Peele
 David and Bathsheba (film), a 1951 American historical epic film